Chilocorus circumdatus, the red chilocorus, is a species of lady beetle in the family Coccinellidae. It is native to Southern Asia, and has been introduced to Hawaii. Helmet shaped, the beetle is rich in Orange-red colour with a fine black margin around the base of wings.

References

Further reading

 

Coccinellidae
Articles created by Qbugbot
Beetles described in 1808